Process is non-linear editing photography software designed for iOS devices. Released in December 2011, Process can import, edit, and share digital photos, and perform non-destructive editing using hardware acceleration.

It is comparable to Apple Inc.'s iPhoto and Adobe Photoshop. The distinction of the application is its ability to create unique photography effects. The application takes the concept of presets (internally known as "processes") one step further, giving them native support, and relying on them as the basis for all photo manipulation.

Features
Real time (live) editing
Non-destructive image processing
Creation and sharing of effects
Non-linear editing

Notes

IOS software
Photo software